Océane Dodin was the defending champion, but withdrew from her second round match due to dizziness.

Alison Van Uytvanck won her maiden WTA singles title, defeating Tímea Babos 5–7, 6–4, 6–1 in the final.

Seeds

Draw

Finals

Top half

Bottom half

Qualifying

Seeds

Qualifiers

Qualifying draw

First qualifier

Second qualifier

Third qualifier

Fourth qualifier

Fifth qualifier

Sixth qualifier

References
Main Draw
Qualifying Draw

Coupe Banque Nationale
Tournoi de Québec
Can